Qingdao Haili Helicopters  is a Chinese aircraft manufacturer. The organization was formed in 2007 to acquire the American helicopter company Brantly International, and manufacture the Brantly B-2 series of helicopters. The company later developed an unmanned version of the Brantly design developed with Weifang Tianxiang Aerospace Industry that was first flown in 2011. In 2011, Superior Aviation Beijing was merged with Brantley. In 2012, the company suspended production of the B2-B due to poor export sales.

Aircraft

References

Bibliography 

Brantly aircraft
Helicopter manufacturers of China
Manufacturing companies based in Qingdao
Vehicle manufacturing companies established in 2007
Chinese brands